Maximilian Bauer (born 23 February 1995) is a German footballer who plays as a defender for 1. FC Schweinfurt 05.

Honours
Regionalliga Bayern: 2019–21

References

External links
 

1995 births
Living people
People from Dachau
Sportspeople from Upper Bavaria
German footballers
Association football defenders
SpVgg Unterhaching players
Regionalliga players
3. Liga players
Footballers from Bavaria
SpVgg Unterhaching II players
SV Heimstetten players